Eve Savander (born 2 September 1998) is a Finnish ice hockey player, currently playing in the Swedish Women's Hockey League (SDHL) with AIK Hockey Dam. Her college ice hockey career was spent with the Ohio State Buckeyes women's ice hockey program in the Western Collegiate Hockey Association (WCHA) conference of the NCAA Division I. 

As a member of the Finnish national team, she won a bronze medal at the 2015 IIHF Women's World Championship.

References

External links

1998 births
Living people
AIK Hockey Dam players
Finnish expatriate ice hockey players in Sweden
Finnish expatriate ice hockey players in the United States
Finnish women's ice hockey defencemen
KalPa Naiset players
Ohio State Buckeyes women's ice hockey players
People from Joensuu
Sportspeople from North Karelia
Team Kuortane players